In the 1941 Virginia gubernatorial election, incumbent Governor James H. Price, a Democrat, was unable to seek re-election due to term limits. U.S. Representative Colgate Darden was nominated by the Democratic Party to run against former Virginia State Senator Benjamin Muse, a Republican.

Candidates
Colgate Darden, U.S. Representative for Virginia's 2nd congressional district (D), who defeated Vivian L. Page.
Benjamin Muse, Former Virginia State Senator from the 8th District (R)

Results

References

Gubernatorial
1941
Virginia
November 1941 events